is a single released by Japanese boy band Arashi. It was released on March 4, 2009 through their record label J Storm. "Believe" was used as the theme song for the Takashi Miike movie Yatterman starring Arashi member Sho Sakurai, and "Kumorinochi Kaisei" was used as the theme song for the drama  starring member Satoshi Ohno. The single was released in three editions: a regular edition containing a bonus track and instrumental versions of all the songs released in the single, and two limited edition both containing a DVD with a music video of one of the A-side tracks.

Single information
"Believe" is the group's first single to have two music videos: a live action and an animated version. The animated video was released on Dwango by animation studio Tatsunoko and the group's record label J Storm. It was later re-released as a bonus in the group's 10th anniversary DVD 5x10 All the Best! Clips 1999-2009 on October 28, 2009. In the animated video, the members transformed into characters from Tatsunoko's Time Bokan anime series. The live action is included in one of the limited editions of the single.

For "Kumorinochi, Kaisei", Ohno sang the track solo and released it under his drama character's name, . The song was also named Best Theme Song in the 60th Television Drama Academy Awards.

Chart performance
In the first half of the year Oricon ranking, "Believe/Kumorinochi, Kaisei" had sold more than 646,000 copies, surpassing the final sales numbers of "Truth/Kaze no Mukō e" in 2008. It sold 501,988 copies during its first week, making it the first single to break half a million in its opening week since KAT-TUN's debut release, "Real Face", of 754,000 in April 2006. The single had the highest first week sales of 2009 until it was topped by the group's next single, "Ashita no Kioku/Crazy Moon (Kimi wa Muteki)".

The single was certified Double Platinum by the Recording Industry Association of Japan. On December 18, 2009, Oricon declared "Believe/Kumorinochi, Kaisei" to be the best-selling single of 2009 in Japan by selling a total of 656,676 copies.

Track listing

Charts and certifications

Weekly charts

Year-end charts

Certifications

Release history

Footnotes

References

External links
 Believe/Kumorinochi, Kaisei product information

Arashi songs
2009 singles
Oricon Weekly number-one singles
Billboard Japan Hot 100 number-one singles
Japanese television drama theme songs
Japanese film songs
2009 songs
Songs written by Sho Sakurai